Margarete "Grete" Adler (13 February 1896 – 10 April 1990) was an Austrian freestyle swimmer, diver, and gymnastics teacher, who competed in the 1912 Summer Olympics and in the 1924 Summer Olympics. She was Jewish, and was born in Vienna.

Adler won the bronze medal in the 4×100 metre freestyle relay event, becoming the first Austrian woman to win an Olympic medal together with her teammates Klara Milch, Josephine Sticker and Berta Zahourek. She is the youngest ever female Austrian Summer Olympics medalist at the age of 16 years and 152 days.

She also participated in the 100 metre freestyle competition but was eliminated in the first round. Twelve years later she was eliminated in the first round of the 10 metre platform diving event.

Olympian 

Aged just 16 she competed at the 1912 Summer Olympics in three events, firstly she was in the 100 metre freestyle competition, where she finished 4th out of 6 in her heat and failing to qualify, her heat was won by Fanny Durack who broke the Olympic record.

On 15 July 1912, she lined up with her teammates against three other countries to compete in the 4 × 100 m freestyle. Although well beaten by Great Britain and Germany they held off Sweden and came away with the bronze medal.

Twelve years later she returned to the Olympic scene at the 1924 Summer Olympics to compete in the 10 metre platform diving event, she finished 4th in her pool and failed to qualify for the final and also ending her Olympic career.

National Champion
 100 meter freestyle (1915, 1921–24)
 300 meter freestyle (1915–16, 1918, 1921)
 400 meter freestyle (1922–24)
 Diving (1915)

See also
 List of select Jewish swimmers

References

1896 births
1990 deaths
Swimmers from Vienna
Austrian female freestyle swimmers
Austrian female divers
Olympic swimmers of Austria
Olympic divers of Austria
Swimmers at the 1912 Summer Olympics
Divers at the 1924 Summer Olympics
Olympic bronze medalists for Austria
Olympic bronze medalists in swimming
Medalists at the 1912 Summer Olympics
19th-century Austrian Jews
Jewish swimmers